Carl Fleming Edwards Jr. (born September 3, 1991) is an American professional baseball pitcher for the Washington Nationals of Major League Baseball (MLB). He has previously played in MLB for the Chicago Cubs, San Diego Padres, Seattle Mariners, Atlanta Braves, and Toronto Blue Jays.

Career

Texas Rangers
Edwards was drafted by the Texas Rangers in the 48th round of the 2011 Major League Baseball draft out of Mid-Carolina High School in Prosperity, South Carolina. Edwards initially committed to play college baseball for the Charleston Southern Buccaneers, where he would join a high school teammate and friend, Will Bedenbaugh. However, when Bedenbaugh died in a car accident, Edwards couldn't face the idea of playing for the team where his friend's absence would be glaring, and decided instead to pursue professional baseball. He spent his first professional season with the Arizona League Rangers and Spokane Indians. He finished the year 5–3 with a 1.48 earned run average (ERA) and 85 strikeouts over 67 innings pitched. He started the 2013 season with the Hickory Crawdads, going 8–2 with a 1.83 ERA and 122 strikeouts over  innings (18 starts).

Chicago Cubs
On July 22, 2013, Edwards along with Mike Olt, Justin Grimm, and a player to be named later (Neil Ramírez) were traded to the Chicago Cubs for Matt Garza. He was sent to the Class A-Advanced Daytona Cubs, where he had a 1.96 ERA and 33 strikeouts over 23 innings (six starts). After the season, he was named MiLB Pitcher of the Year.

Prior to the 2014 season, he was ranked by Baseball America as the 28th best prospect in baseball. He spent the 2014 season with the AA Tennessee Smokies, where he compiled a 1–2 record and 2.44 ERA over ten starts. On November 20, 2014, Edwards was added to the Cubs 40-man roster in order to protect him from the Rule 5 Draft. He began 2015 with Tennessee, and was promoted to the AAA Iowa Cubs in May.

2015 season
On September 7, 2015, Edwards made his Major League debut for the Cubs against the St. Louis Cardinals at Busch Stadium. In 36 appearances out of the bullpen between both Tennessee and Iowa prior to his callup, he was 5–3 with a 2.77 ERA and 75 strikeouts over  innings.

2016 season
Edwards began 2016 with Iowa. He was recalled May 11 to Chicago, but returned to Iowa the next day. He was recalled once again on June 20 and spent the rest of the season with Chicago. On September 1, Edwards recorded his first Major League save, against the San Francisco Giants. Edwards finished the 2016 season with a 3.75 ERA in 35 innings pitched. 

On October 25, Edwards along with teammates Addison Russell, Dexter Fowler, and Jason Heyward became the first African-Americans to play for the Cubs in a World Series game. In Game 3, he struck out the side in relief duty in the top of the sixth inning against the Cleveland Indians, becoming the first African-American to pitch for the Cubs in a World Series game. Edwards appeared in the bottom of the 10th inning of Game 7, where he recorded the first two outs of the inning and surrendered one run. The Cubs went on to win their first World Series in 108 years.

2017 season
2017 was Edwards' first full season in the major leagues; he was 5–4 with a 2.98 ERA and 94 strikeouts in  relief innings pitched.

Edwards struggled in the division series against the Washington Nationals, pitching  innings and allowing six runs. Notably, he allowed a game-tying two-run home run to Bryce Harper in the eighth inning of Game 2. Edwards' performance improved during the league championship series against the Los Angeles Dodgers, again pitching  innings, but this time allowing no runs.

2018 season
In 2018, Edwards posted a 3–2 record and recorded 67 strikeouts and a 2.60 ERA in 52 innings.

2019 season
Edwards suffered from various injuries in 2019, and struggled from the start of the year. He pitched in four games between March 30 and April 5, recording only five outs. He allowed three hits (two home runs), five walks, and six runs. He was optioned to the Iowa Cubs on April 6 to work through his mechanics. The Cubs recalled Edwards on May 6.

San Diego Padres
On July 31, 2019, Edwards was traded to the San Diego Padres in exchange for Brad Wieck. Edwards struggled greatly in San Diego, posting a 32.40 ERA in 2 games for the team. On November 4, 2019, he cleared waivers and elected free agency.

Seattle Mariners
On December 4, 2019, Edwards signed a one-year contract with the Seattle Mariners. In 2020, he allowed 1 run over 5 games, striking out 6. On October 22, 2020, Edwards elected free agency after being outrighted off of the 40-man roster.

Atlanta Braves
On January 29, 2021, Edwards signed a minor league contract with the Atlanta Braves organization. On March 25, 2021, he opted out of his contract and became a free agent. On April 5, 2021, Edwards re-signed with the Braves on a new minor league contract. On May 7, 2021, Edwards was selected to the active roster. He allowed 3 runs on 3 hits and a walk before being designated for assignment the next day. On May 10, Edwards elected free agency.

Toronto Blue Jays
On May 14, 2021, Edwards signed a minor league contract with the Toronto Blue Jays organization and was assigned to the Triple-A Buffalo Bisons. On May 30, Edwards was selected to the active roster. On June 17, he was placed on the 60-day injured list with a left oblique strain. He was released by the organization on August 29, 2021.

Chicago White Sox
On August 31, 2021, Edwards signed a minor league contract with the Chicago White Sox and was assigned to the Triple-A Charlotte Knights.

Washington Nationals
On February 25, 2022, Edwards signed a minor league contract with the Washington Nationals. For the 2022 season, Edwards added a change-up to his arsenal. Dominant with the Triple-A Rochester Red Wings, Edwards earned a call-up to the majors, which happened on May 10.

On January 13, 2023, Edwards agreed to a one-year, $2.25 million contract with the Nationals, avoiding salary arbitration.

Personal life
Edwards and his fiancée, Anquinette Smith, welcomed their first child in August 2015, and their second in July 2018. Edwards and Anquinette married in 2021.

Miscellaneous
Edwards was sometimes known as "C.J." (for Carl Jr.) in the minor leagues, a name which Joe Maddon continued to use while the two were with the Cubs. Edwards also earned the nickname "The String Bean Slinger" for his strong arm combined with his skinny physique (6' 3", 170 lbs), which he has adopted for the back of his personalized jersey during the annual Players Weekend.

Notes

References

External links

The amazing story of Cubs prospect C.J. Edwards
Weight, not wait, issue for Cubs' Edwards
Out of nowhere: Cubs see a bright future for C.J. Edwards

1991 births
Living people
African-American baseball players
Arizona League Cubs players
Arizona League Rangers players
Atlanta Braves players
Baseball players from South Carolina
Buffalo Bisons (minor league) players
Chicago Cubs players
Daytona Cubs players
El Paso Chihuahuas players
Hickory Crawdads players
Iowa Cubs players
Major League Baseball pitchers
Mesa Solar Sox players
People from Newberry, South Carolina
People from Prosperity, South Carolina
San Diego Padres players
Seattle Mariners players
Spokane Indians players
Tennessee Smokies players
Toronto Blue Jays players
Twitch (service) streamers
Washington Nationals players
21st-century African-American sportspeople
Florida Complex League Blue Jays players